The Tatra chamois (Rupicapra rupicapra tatrica;) is a subspecies of the chamois of the genus Rupicapra. Tatra chamois live in the Tatra Mountains in Slovakia and Poland.

Population and distribution
The Tatra chamois live in all parts of the Tatras: West Tatras (Slovakia and Poland) and Eastern Tatras, which consist of the High Tatras (Slovakia and Poland) and the Belianske Tatras (Slovakia), all protected by national parks in both countries.

The population has undergone several troughs  and peaks in known history, with the most noticeable troughs occurring during both world wars. The largest population in the 20th century was recorded in the year 1964, when as much as 940 individuals were counted in the Slovak region of the Tatras. Subsequently, the population declined steadily to the lowest recorded numbers in history at the end of the century. During the years 1999-2000 numbers dropped below 200 individuals, which is considered a critical population size for the long-term survival of the subspecies.

A 5-year programme to save the Tatra chamois started in 2001, focusing on preserving its environment - especially during the mating season - by strict regulation of tourism and suppression of poaching. The population started to recover, and after some 10 years it even reached its highest numbers in recorded history.

As of 2006, the Slovak Tatra National Park was home to 371 chamois, of which 72 were lambs, and the Polish Tatra National Park was home to 117 chamois, of which 27 were lambs. As of 2010, a population recovered to 841 chamois, of which 74 were lambs, 699 (57 lambs) in Slovakia and 142 (17 lambs) in Poland, which is near the peak of 1964. The highest ever population was recorded in 2018, when 1,431 individuals were counted in Tatras.

Census results:

Introduction to the Low Tatras
Because of concerns about survivability in its native range, the Tatra chamois  was also artificially introduced into the Low Tatras mountains, situated south of Tatras, between the years 1969 and 1976, to create a reserve population there. The introduction involved 30 individuals and was successful as the population grew to a stable 100-130 individuals.

However, recent DNA studies have shown  that the Low Tatras population crossbred with Alpine chamois  migrating from the Fatra mountains and the Slovak Paradise National Park. The Low Tatra chamois are no longer considered pure and therefore cannot act as a reserve population for the Tatra chamois. The Alpine chamois were introduced into Slovakia for hunting purposes before the Tatra chamois were officially classified as a separate subspecies.

References

External links

IUCN Red List of Threatened Species: Rupicapra rupicapra tatrica (Tatra chamois) — Listed as Endangered (EN) B1+2ab.

Caprids
Endemic fauna of Poland
Endemic fauna of Slovakia
Mammals of Europe
Tatra Mountains
Critically endangered animals